Gibbus is an extinct genus of air-breathing land snails, terrestrial pulmonate gastropod mollusks in the family Streptaxidae.

Distribution 
The genus Gibbus was endemic to Mauritius and it is now extinct.

Species
Species within the genus Gibbus include:
 † Gibbus lyonetianus Pallas, 1780

References

Streptaxidae
Extinct gastropods
Taxonomy articles created by Polbot